Charles Evans was an American baseball right fielder in the Negro leagues. He played with the Baltimore Black Sox in 1921.

References

External links
  and Seamheads

Baltimore Black Sox players
Year of birth missing
Year of death missing
Baseball outfielders